The Tula Mountains are a group of extensive mountains lying immediately eastward of Amundsen Bay in Enderby Land, Antarctica. They were discovered on January 14, 1930, by the British Australian New Zealand Antarctic Research Expedition (BANZARE) under Mawson and named "Tula Range" by him after John Biscoe's brig, the Tula, from which Biscoe discovered Enderby Land in 1831. The term "mountains" was recommended for the group following an ANARE (Australian National Antarctic Research Expeditions) sledge survey in 1958 by G.A. Knuckey.

Named Tula mountains

Mount Bartlett
Mount Bond
Mount Degerfeldt
Mount Denham
Mount Dungey
Mount Hampson
Mount Hardy
Mount Harvey
Mount Henksen
Mount Keyser
Mount King
Mount Letten
Mount Lunde
Mount Mateer
Mount Morrison
Mount Parviainen
Mount Porteus
Pythagoras Peak
Mount Reed
Mount Renouard
Mount Rhodes
Mount Riiser-Larsen
Mount Ryder
Mount Selwood
Mount Shirshov
Mount Sones
Mount Storer

See also
Gage Ridge

References 

Mountain ranges of Enderby Land